The Judy Gaines Young Book Award is given annually by Transylvania University to honor the author of a book of distinction written in the Appalachian region in the previous two or three years. The award was endowed in 2015 by Dr. Byron Young, a Lexington-area professor and neurologist, in honor of his late wife.

The program is currently coordinated by Transylvania Professor of English Martha Billips and Poet-in-Residence Maurice Manning.

Winners 
 2015 - Holly Goddard Jones for The Next Time You See Me
 2016 - Amy Greene for Long Man
 2017 - Crystal Wilkinson for The Birds of Opulence
 2018 - Kathleen Driskell for Next Door to the Dead
 2019 - Silas House for Southernmost
 2020 - Frank X Walker for Last Will, Last Testament

Past Nominees

2015 
 Ron Houchin for The Man Who Saws Us in Half
 George Ella Lyon for Many-Storied House
 Jeff Daniel Marion for Letters to the Dead
 Allison Seay for To See the Queen
 Lee Smith for Guests on Earth

2016 
 Robert Gipe for Trampoline (first nomination)
 T.J. Jarrett for Zion
 Jeremy B. Jones for Bearwallow
 Denton Loving for Crimes Against Birds
 George Ella Lyon for What Forest Knows

2017 
 Lee Smith for Dimestore

2018 
 Darnell Arnoult for Galaxie Wagon
 Robert Gipe for Trampoline (second nomination)
 Mark Powell for Small Treasons
 Mary Ann Taylor-Hall for Out of Nowhere

References

External links

American literary awards
Transylvania University
Appalachian culture
Awards established in 2015